Yulia Pinkusevich (born 1982, Kharkov, Ukraine) is a visual artist working across various disciplines including painting, drawing, and sculpture. Pinkusevich is represented by Marlborough Gallery in New York. She is the Joan Danforth Professor of Painting at Mills College of Northeastern in Oakland, California. Accepting the position in 2014 after artist Hung Liu and Jay DeFeo held it respectively.

Work
Pinkusevich creates large-scale multi-faceted installation work that presents viewers with visually immersive environments. In an interview, she explains: "Conceptually, my work is concerned with this fragmented vision of architectural layering and perceptions of the built environment. Formally, the work is engaged with the direct experience of the viewer through "perspectival" illusion and spatial perception that play with the subconscious and cognitive understanding of space. By breaking logical perspectives I create illusions of impossible spaces, non-places that shift the viewpoint to the panoptic."

References

1982 births
Living people
Artists from Kharkiv
Ukrainian sculptors
Ukrainian painters
Ukrainian women sculptors
Women sculptors
Ukrainian women painters
Stanford University alumni